The Election Commission of India held indirect 8th presidential elections of India on 12 July 1982. Zail Singh with 754,113 votes won over his nearest rival Hans Raj Khanna who got 282,685 votes.
Zail Singh was the first and till date only Sikh to be the President of India.

Schedule
The election schedule was announced by the Election Commission of India on 9 June 1982.

Results
Source: Web archive of Election Commission of India website

See also
 1979 Indian vice presidential election

References

1982 elections in India
Presidential elections in India